The Vellore block is a revenue block in the Vellore district of Tamil Nadu, India. It has a total of 22 panchayat villages.

References 
 

Revenue blocks of Vellore district